Creeper, Creepers, or The Creeper may refer to:

Plants and animals 
 Creepers, birds of the families Certhiidae treecreepers:
 Brown creeper (New Zealand)
 the Climacteridae Australasian treecreeper
 the Rhabdornithidae Philippine creeper
 Long-billed creeper
 Stripe-breasted creeper
 Stripe-headed creeper
 Creepers, various vines, particularly species in the genus Parthenocissus

Arts, entertainment, and media

Fictional characters
 Creeper (DC Comics), a DC Comics character
 Creeper (Minecraft), creatures found within the video game Minecraft
 Creeper, a fictional hard rock band from 2001 Canadian film Fubar
 Creeper, a spirit character in the 2005 video game The Suffering: Ties That Bind
 Creepers, mechanical monsters in the Shannara fantasy novels
 The Creeper, a character played by Rondo Hatton in several horror movies
 The Creeper, a creature in the 2001 horror film Jeepers Creepers

Films
 The Creeper (film), a 1948 horror film
 Phenomena (film), a 1985 horror film by Dario Argento also called Creepers
 The Crawlers (film), a 1993 Italian horror film by Joe D'Amato and Fabrizio Laurenti also called Creepers
 Creepers (film), an upcoming horror film directed by Marc Klasfeld

Music

Groups
 Creeper (band), an English horror punk band
 The Creepers, an English rock band

Recordings
 Creeper (EP), by the band Creeper
 The Creeper (album), a 1981 jazz album by trumpeter Donald Byrd
 "The Creeper", a song on the 2002 album Safety, Fun, and Learning (In That Order) by We Are Scientists

Other uses in arts, entertainment, and media
 Creepers (novel), a 2006 novel by David Morrell
 Creepers (video game), by Psygnosis

Other uses 
 Creeper (program), a 1971 early self-replicating computer program
 Creeper (tool), a low-profile, wheeled platform used by auto mechanics
 Creeper, an infant bodysuit, a one-piece article of infant clothing 
 Brothel creepers or creepers, a type of shoe
 CREEPER (Curbing Realistic Exploitative Electronic Pedophilic Robots), a US Act about Sex robot#Legislation

See also 
 Creep (disambiguation)
 The Kreeper, a nickname given to the American rapper and record producer Kirk Knight

Animal common name disambiguation pages